Soroko may refer to:

Places
Soroko, Benin
Soroko, Tillabéri, Dosso, Niger

People
Soroko, a variant of the family name Soroka. It may refer to:
Artem Soroko (born 1992), Belarusian football player
Zdislav Soroko, Soviet sprint canoer
Serge Sorokko (born 1954), American art dealer and publisher 
Tatiana Sorokko (born 1971), Russian-born American model

Other uses
Soroko, variant spelling of Sorko, people speaking Sorko language in Niger

See also
Soroako, a mining town in Indonesia